The 2018 Piala Presiden is the 34th season of the Piala Presiden, the youth level (Under-21) football league of Malaysia. The competition organized by the Football Association of Malaysia (FAM).

Rule changes
The Piala Presiden is the amateur football competition in Malaysia for under-21 players. Since its inception in 1985, Piala Presiden has been the major tournament for under-21 and under-23 players. In 2009, the format of the competition was changed with only under-20 players eligible to be fielded for the tournament. In 2015 the format of the competition reverted to the original format with under-21 players.

Teams
The following teams will be participate in the 2018 Piala Presiden.

League table

Group A

Group B

Result table

Group A

Group B

Knock-out stage

Bracket

Quarterfinals
The first legs were played on 6 August, and the second legs were played on 10 August 2018.
|-
}

Felda United U21 won 3–2 on aggregate.

2–2 on aggregate. Kedah U21 won on away goals.

Johor Darul Ta'zim III won 4–1 on aggregate.

3–3 on aggregate. Terengganu III won on away goals.

Semi-finals 
The first legs will be played on 16 August, and the second legs will be played on 20 August 2018.
|-

Kedah U19 won 4–2 on aggregate.

Terengganu III won 1–0 on aggregate.

Final

Champions

See also
 2018 Malaysia Super League
 2018 Malaysia Premier League
 2018 Malaysia FAM Cup
 2018 Malaysia FA Cup
 2018 Malaysia Youth League

References

External links
 Football Association of Malaysia
 SPMB 

5
Piala Presiden (Malaysia)